Askino (Asqın) is a rural locality (a village) in Arkh-Latyshsky Selsoviet, Arkhangelsky District, Bashkortostan, Russia. The population was 2 as of 2010. There is 1 street.

Geography 
Askino is located 23 km south of Arkhangelskoye (the district's administrative centre) by road. Ubalary is the nearest rural locality.

References 

Rural localities in Arkhangelsky District